Afshin Jafari, known by the mononym Afshin (born 6 May 1978), is an Iranian singer based in UAE.

Afshin moved with his family when he was seven. He started learning guitar at age 10 and started writing music and lyrics early on. In 1995, his family immigrated to Germany when he was 17 where they resided in Mannheim. Singing in Persian diaspora events and venues, at 21 he signed a contract with ParsVideo specializing in Iranian music. Afshin incorporated elements of Iranian music and youth-oriented western pop, hip hop and rap music in his songs and launched a number of albums and music videos that became popular in Germany and the Iranian diaspora. He is supported by Taraneh Records and Avang Music. His brother Amir Ali, a rapper, has contributed to some of his more recent releases.

Discography

Albums

References

External links 
Official Afshin website
Melodica record label website
Tehran Magazine. "Afshin and His Exciting Concert". number 477, pages 72–73

1978 births
Living people
Iranian pop singers
People from Babol
Singers of Iranian descent